Angela and Jennifer Chun are Korean-American violinists and collaborative artists.

Biography 
They were born in Korea, and took up the violin as children while living in Seattle. They attended Juilliard School and have studied under Dorothy DeLay, Felix Galimir, and Nathan Milstein. They live and work in New York and London. Their recordings include music by Shostakovich, Bartók, Philip Glass, Nico Muhly, and Isang Yun. Angela Chun plays a Domenico Montagnana violin from 1734. Jennifer Chun's violin was built by Nicolo Amati in 1662 and is called the "Goding". The sisters often perform as a violin duo. At one time, Jennifer Chun dated George Soros.

Discography
 Fantasy, 2008
 Bartók, 2010
 Philip Glass: In the Summer House, Mad Rush and Nico Muhly: Four Studies, Honest Music, 2016

References

Further reading
 
 
 
 
 
 
 
 Lewis, Dave. "Fantasy" [review]. AllMusic.com.

External links
 Official Website

American classical violinists
American musical duos
American people of Korean descent